Tanduay Distillers, Inc.  is a Philippine alcoholic beverage company. It is a subsidiary of LT Group, a conglomerate owned by Filipino business magnate Lucio Tan. As of 2021, it is the world's largest rum brand.

History

Tanduay traces its origins to a distillery in Hagonoy, Bulacan originally owned by Elías Menchatorre. In 1856, the distillery was acquired by Valentin Teus e Yrisarry and brought into Ynchausti y Compañía, a prominent Philippine multi-national conglomerate led by the Ynchausti family. Although the Hagonoy distillery was already in operation at the time of the acquisition, Ynchausti y Compañia decided to use its own foundation date (1854) as the distillery's foundation date. Six years later, a rectifying plant was constructed in Isla de Tanduay, bordering the Quiapo and San Miguel districts of Manila, becoming the original Tanduay distillery. To this day, the Ynchausti family crest can still be seen on every bottle of Tanduay.

There are no records of the product names produced by these two distilleries and it can be assumed that all alcoholic products of the period were sold without brand names or distinctive labels and were referred to by their generic names: "aguardiente" (Spanish for firewater), "tubâ" (palm wine) and "ron" (Spanish for rum). However, earliest records of the distillery list its rum simply as "ron de destillería de Hagonoy y Tanduay" (literally, “rum from the distillery of Hagonoy and Tanduay”).

By the 1900s, production would shift to the Manila distillery. By the 1930s, the rum it produced became branded as Tanduay Rhum and its packaging was changed from the 10 gallons dama juana container to the smaller (375 ml, 750 ml) glass bottles.

Tanduay Distillery, Inc.
In 1934 and 1935, Elizalde & Company, a new company established by the grandchildren of Joaquín Marcelino Elizalde e Yrisarry (one of the original minority partners of Ynchausti y Compañia) acquired some of the major business assets of Ynchausti & Compañia, including the Tanduay distillery, when Manuel de Ynchausti made the decision to divest key assets of Ynchausti y Compañia. Under the ownership of the Elizalde group, the Tanduay distillery operated under the corporate name Tanduay Distillery, Inc. and became a successful enterprise, producing quality rum and other distilled spirits for both domestic and international markets.

Tanduay Distillers, Inc.
On May 18, 1988, Twin Ace Holdings Corporation, a company owned by Lucio Tan, acquired the Tanduay brand and related assets of Tanduay Distillery, Inc. from Elizalde & Company, Inc. The new management launched a plant modernization and expansion program that increased the distillery's production capacity by almost 50 times. On July 30, 1999 Twin Ace Holdings changed its corporate name to Tanduay Distillers, Inc. Aside from rum, Tanduay Distillers, Inc. also produces gin, vodka, brandy, and whiskey.

Subsidiaries:
 Asian Alcohol Corporation
 Absolut Distillers, Inc. (formerly, Absolut Chemicals, Inc.)

LT Group, Inc.
On July 8, 1999, Asian Pacific Equity Corporation, a company also owned and controlled by Lucio Tan, acquired 100% ownership of Twin Ace Holdings Corporation via a share swap with Twin Ace's existing shareholders. On November 10, 1999, APEC changed its corporate name to Tanduay Holdings, Inc. and increased authorized capital from 1 billion pesos to 5 billion pesos at a par value of 1.00 peso per share. In October 2012, Tanduay Holdings, Inc. was renamed LT Group, Inc..

Heritage

Coat of arms
The Tanduay coat of arms has appeared in the label of Tanduay branded products since the time of Tanduay Distillery, Inc.  (predecessor of the current company, Tanduay Distillers, Inc.). It features two escutcheons (shields). The left shield is based on the escutcheon of the Ynchausti family crest, the original owners of the Tanduay distillery.

The original Tanduay distillery

The original Tanduay distillery located at Calle Tanduay (now, J. Nepomuceno Street) in Quiapo, Manila has been Tanduay's prime production facility until it was decommissioned in April 2013. Tanduay Distillers, Inc. announced that production will be relocated to a larger facility located in Cabuyao, Laguna, capable of producing 100,000 cases a day. The original distillery's production capacity was at 30,000 cases a day. Portions of the original distillery will be converted into a museum to showcase the history and heritage of Tanduay. The distillery may be reopened in the future, if needed, to serve as backup production facility.

Etymology
The original Tanduay distillery adopted its name from its original location on Isla de Tanduay, a triangular area of Manila bounded by the esteros (estuaries) of San Miguel and San Sebastian. "Tanduay" comes from the word "tangwáy", the Tagalog term for "peninsula" that also meant "low-lying land". This was because the entire area, including nearby Quiapo, was frequently flooded during the rainy season. In Cebuano, "tanguay" meant a place where tubâ (palm wine) is bought and sold.

NBA sponsorship

In March 2017, Tanduay became the first Philippine brand to have a major sponsorship deal with a National Basketball Association team and arena. The partnership will designate Tanduay as the official rum of Barclays Center and the Brooklyn Nets, as well as the presenting sponsor of the venue's 40/40 Club & Restaurant for the remainder of the 2016–17 NBA season. Additionally, Tanduay Rhum will be an associate sponsor of the arena's Brooklyn Show platform and will have a variety of signage integrated throughout the venue.

In October 2017, Tanduay signed a two-year partnership with the Golden State Warriors, designating Tanduay as the presenting sponsor of various games of the Warriors including the Warriors' Filipino Heritage Night on October 29, 2017. The partnership will run from the 2017–18 NBA season until the end of the 2018–19 NBA season. Additionally, Tanduay will benefit from a variety of signage integrated throughout the Warriors home venue, the Oracle Arena.

On January 22, 2021, Tanduay signed a three-year sponsorship deal with the Milwaukee Bucks, designating Tanduay as the official rum of the Bucks. In April 2021, Tanduay entered a partnership with the Phoenix Suns.

Ethyl Alcohol
In March 2020, during COVID-19 pandemic the company starts producing Ethyl Alcohol with Absolut Distillers, Inc. for hospitals to help the alcohol shortage in medical facilities.

See also
 Ynchausti y Compañia
 Tanduay Rhum Masters (PBA team)
 Tanduay Light Rhum Masters (PBA D-League team)
 Tanduay Rum Masters (MPBL and Filbasket team)

References

Further reading
 
 Tanduay at wartime

External links
 Tanduay Distillers, Inc.

Drink companies of the Philippines
Philippine alcoholic drinks
Philippine brands
Distilleries in the Philippines
Rums of the Pacific Rim
Products introduced in 1854
Companies established in 1854
1854 establishments in the Philippines